Chaffee is a lunar impact crater that is located in the southern hemisphere on the far side of the Moon. It lies within the huge walled plain Apollo, and is one of several craters in that formation named for astronauts and people associated with the Apollo program. This basin is a double-ringed formation, and the crater Chaffee is situated across the southwest part of the inner ring. The ridge from this ring extends northward from the northern rim of Chaffee.

This is a circular crater with an outer rim that has an uneven form due to multiple small outward bulges. The perimeter is only slightly worn, and retains a sharp rim that projects above the surroundings. Two notable craters are attached to the outer rim: Chaffee F to the west and Chaffee W along the northwest. Chaffee actually intrudes somewhat into the former crater, and the two share a common rim. There is also a tiny craterlet exactly on the rim to the south-southeast.

The inner walls of Chaffee do not have a well-formed terrace system, and they slope downward to debris piles that extend part way across the floor. Parts of the interior floor are relatively level and featureless. However, there are several small craters lying in the northern half, particularly to the northwest of the midpoint.

The crater is named after astronaut Roger Chaffee, killed in the Apollo 1 fire.  The nearby craters White and Grissom were named after the other two astronauts killed in the disaster, Ed White and Gus Grissom.

Satellite craters
By convention these features are identified on lunar maps by placing the letter on the side of the crater midpoint that is closest to Chaffee.

References

 
 
 
 
 
 
 
 
 
 
 
 

Impact craters on the Moon